Seputus is a discoid fossil from the Ordovician that may represent a Cambroernid.

References

Ordovician invertebrates
Prehistoric animal genera